Pankaj Pachauri (born 24 September 1963) is an Indian TV anchor and journalist. He is the founder and editor-in-chief of Gonews, India's first app based TV News channel. Pachauri was associated with NDTV for 15 years. He was also associated with other international media houses including the BBC, India Today, The Sunday Observer and tha Patriot newspaper. He has been a member of the National Integration Council.

He won 'The Statesman Award for Rural Reporting' in 1989 for his exposé on the practice of female infanticide in Rajasthan.

In January 2012, Pachauri was appointed as the Communications Adviser to the Prime Minister's Office in India under Dr Manmohan Singh, where he designed and executed the PMO's media strategy across various platforms for international events. Pachauri participates in television debates and speaks at institutions like the Indian Institute of Management Calcutta, Kolkata and Indian School of Business, Hyderabad. From 2015 to 2016 he was director at the Jaypee Business School, Noida.

References

External links
 Pankaj Pachauri defends PM Manmohan Singh's ten-year tenure
 The current state of electoral reforms
 The current state of electoral reforms

Indian male television journalists
Living people
People from New Delhi
NDTV Group
1963 births
Manmohan Singh administration
Indian television news anchors
20th-century Indian journalists
Journalists from Delhi
Dr. Bhimrao Ambedkar University alumni